Acting Good is a Canadian television comedy series, which premiered October 17, 2022 on CTV Comedy Channel. The series stars comedian Paul Rabliauskas as a young First Nations man who returns home to live in his small reserve community in northern Manitoba following a failed attempt to establish himself in Winnipeg. The series is loosely based around his own experiences having to move back home to live with his family during the COVID-19 pandemic in Canada.

The cast also includes Pat Thornton, Billy Merasty, Roseanne Supernault, Tina Keeper and Rosanna Deerchild.

Directors include Michael Greyeyes and Darlene Naponse. The series is being produced by Keeper's Kistikan Pictures.

References

2022 Canadian television series debuts
2020s Canadian sitcoms
CTV Comedy Channel original programming
First Nations television series
Television shows set in Manitoba
Television shows filmed in Manitoba